Melaleuca araucarioides is a plant in the myrtle family, Myrtaceae and is endemic to a small area of the south-west Western Australia.  It is a many-branched shrub with the leaves arranged in a way that gives the plant the appearance of a conifer.

Description
They are crowded and arranged in groups of three forming six rows of leaves along the branches.

The flowers are pale cream-coloured in one or two heads on the ends of the younger branches or often on older wood. As with other melaleucas, the stamens are joined in bundles and in this species there are usually only 3 stamens per bundle.

Taxonomy and naming
Melaleuca araucarioides was first formally described in 1988 by Bryan Barlow in Nuytsia (journal) as a new species. It had formerly been included in Melaleuca blaeriifolia Turcz. to which it is closely related. The specific epithet (araucarioides) "alludes to the superficial resemblance of the leafy shoots to those of the gymnosperm genus Araucaria Juss.". It is distuished from M. blaeriifolia mainly on the basis of the distinctive, regular leaf arrangement and the smaller size of the fruits.

Distribution and habitat
This melaleuca is confined to the Ongerup-Cape Riche area in the Esperance plains and Mallee biogeographic regions of Western Australia. It grows in well-drained sandy or loamy soils in heaths or open woodlands.

Conservation status
Melaleuca araucarioides is classified as "not threatened" by the Government of Western Australia Department of Parks and Wildlife.

References 

araucarioides
Myrtales of Australia
Plants described in 1998
Endemic flora of Western Australia